John Albert Gibert M.D. House is a historic home located near McCormick in McCormick County, South Carolina.  It was built about 1867, and is a two-story, frame, I-house embellished with Greek Revival style decorative elements.  It features a full-height portico supported by massive Doric order masonry columns.  Also on the property is a one-story frame outbuilding (c. 1900), originally a single dwelling, but which later served as a general store.

It was listed on the National Register of Historic Places in 1993.

References 

Houses on the National Register of Historic Places in South Carolina
Greek Revival houses in South Carolina
Houses completed in 1867
Houses in McCormick County, South Carolina
National Register of Historic Places in McCormick County, South Carolina
I-houses in South Carolina